Christian Torres or Cristian Torres may refer to:

 Christian Torres (footballer, born 1969), Chilean football forward
 Cristian Torres (footballer, born 1985), Latvian football midfielder
 Christian Torres (footballer, born 1996), Mexican football defender
 Cristian Torres (footballer, born 1996), Mexican football defender
 Christian Torres (footballer, born 2004), Mexican football winger